This is a list of ministers from Second Hemant Soren cabinet starting from December 2019.

Hemant Soren is the leader of Jharkhand Mukti Morcha, who was sworn in the Chief Minister of Jharkhand on 29 December 2019.

In the current government, 6 ministers including the Chief Minister belongs to the Jharkhand Mukti Morcha, 4 ministers belongs to the Indian National Congress and 1 minister belongs to the Rashtriya Janata Dal.

Along with the Chief Minister, there are 10 Cabinet Ministers.

Council of Ministers

Ministers by Party

Former Ministers

References

Jharkhand Legislative Assembly
Cabinets established in 2019
2019 establishments in Jharkhand
Lists of current Indian state and territorial ministries
2019 in Indian politics
Jharkhand ministries

Jharkhand Mukti Morcha
Rashtriya Janata Dal